Lamain is a village of Wallonia and a district of the municipality of Tournai, located in the province of Hainaut, Belgium. 

Tournai
Former municipalities of Hainaut (province)